The 2016–17 NHL Three Star Awards are the way the National Hockey League denotes its players of the week and players of the month of the 2016–17 season.

Weekly

Monthly

Rookie of the Month

See also
Three stars (ice hockey)
2016–17 NHL season
2016–17 NHL suspensions and fines
2016–17 NHL transactions
2016 NHL Entry Draft
2016 in sports
2017 in sports
2015–16 NHL Three Star Awards
2017–18 NHL Three Star Awards

References

Three Star Awards
Lists of NHL Three Star Awards